Egyptology is the fourth studio album by World Party released in 1997, re-released in 2006. It contained the #31 British single "Beautiful Dream" and the award-winning She's the One, among other songs.  But the album was not a commercial success, and Karl Wallinger was upset when his label, Chrysalis, used "She's the One" as a vehicle for pop artist Robbie Williams; Williams' version hit #1 on the British pop charts and won Williams several awards. Wallinger later wrote:
I was so lucky that Robbie recorded "She's the One" because it allowed me to keep going [after his aneurysm in 2000]. He nicked my pig and killed it but gave me enough bacon to live on for four years. He kept my kids in school and me in Seaview [Wallinger's recording studio] and for that I thank him.

Due in part to the disagreement over "She's the One", Egyptology would be Wallinger's last album with Chrysalis; his 2000 album Dumbing Up was released on his own label.

Track listing

"It Is Time" (3:20)
"Beautiful Dream" (4:45)
"Call Me Up" (2:57)
"Vanity Fair" (3:33)
"She's the One" (4:56)
"Vocal Interlude" (0:24)
"Curse of the Mummy's Tomb" (5:58)
"Hercules" (3:15)
"Love Is Best" (3:03)
"Rolling Off a Log" (5:54)
"Strange Groove" (4:10)
"The Whole of the Night" (3:15)
"Piece of Mind" (4:58)
"This World" (4:21)
"Always" (4:23)

Personnel
Karl Wallinger - all instruments except where noted
Chris Sharrock - drums, northern vibes

Guest musicians 
Johnson Somerset - loops on tracks 11 and 15
Anthony Thistlethwaite - "additional massed saxes" on track 3
John Turnbull - guitar on track 12

Charts

References

1997 albums
World Party albums